Mystrocneme is a genus of moths in the subfamily Arctiinae. The genus was erected by Gottlieb August Wilhelm Herrich-Schäffer in 1855.

Species
 Mystrocneme albicorpus Kaye, 1911
 Mystrocneme atavia Hampson, 1898
 Mystrocneme sectum Kaye, 1911
 Mystrocneme varipes Walker, 1854

References

External links

Arctiinae